Aberdeen South is a burgh constituency of the House of Commons of the Parliament of the United Kingdom and it elects one Member of Parliament (MP) by the first-past-the-post system of election.

The constituency was first used in the 1885 general election, but has undergone boundary changes since then. There was also an Aberdeen South Holyrood constituency, a constituency of the Scottish Parliament, created in 1999 with the boundaries of the Westminster constituency at that time. In 2011 the Scottish Parliament constituency of Aberdeen South was abolished and replaced with the Aberdeen South and North Kincardine constituency.

Constituency profile 

Aberdeen South is an affluent suburban constituency located along the south of the Aberdeen City Council area. The seat covers most of Aberdeen's affluent West End and the outer villages of Bieldside, Cults, Milltimber and Peterculter. Situated within the constituency are some of Scotland's most affluent neighbourhoods, including Broomhill, Rubislaw and Queen's Cross, which was named the wealthiest part of Scotland in 2003. The seat also extends south-east across the River Dee to cover the suburb of Cove Bay and the more deprived neighbourhoods of Torry and Kincorth.

Boundaries

Current 

As redefined by the Fifth Review of the Boundary Commission for Scotland, and subsequently first used in the 2005 general election, Aberdeen South is entirely within the Aberdeen City council area and one of five constituencies covering that council area and the Aberdeenshire council area.

To the south and west of Aberdeen South there is West Aberdeenshire and Kincardine, which is entirely within the Aberdeenshire area. To the north there is Aberdeen North which, like Aberdeen South is entirely within the Aberdeen City area. Further north there is Gordon, which covers part of the Aberdeen City area and part of the Aberdeenshire area. To the north of Gordon there is Banff and Buchan which, like West Aberdeenshire and Kincardine, is entirely within the Aberdeenshire area.

Historic

1885 to 1918 
From 1832 to 1885 there was a single Aberdeen constituency. Prior to 1832, the burgh of Aberdeen had been represented as a component of the Aberdeen Burghs constituency.

When Aberdeen South was created by the Redistribution of Seats Act 1885 and first used in the 1885 general election, so was Aberdeen North. Aberdeen South then consisted of the municipal wards of St Nicholas, Rosemount, Rubislaw and Ferryhill, and the 9th Parliamentary Polling District. The rest of the county of Aberdeen was covered by the county constituencies of Eastern Aberdeenshire and Western Aberdeenshire.

The same boundaries were used in the 1886 general election, the 1892 general election, the 1895 general election, the 1900 general election, the 1906 general election, the January 1910 general election and the December 1910 general election.

1918 to 1950 
In 1918 constituency boundaries were redefined by the Representation of the People Act 1918. By then the City of Aberdeen had been created; Aberdeen North and Aberdeen South became the two constituencies covering the city (which was one of four counties of cities in Scotland) and entirely within the city. The new boundaries were first used in the 1918 general election, and Aberdeen South then consisted of the wards of Ferryhill, Rosemount, Rubislaw, Ruthrieston and St Nicholas. The county of Aberdeen was covered by Aberdeen and Kincardine East, Central Aberdeenshire and Kincardine and West Aberdeenshire. East Aberdeenshire and West Aberdeenshire were entirely within the county of Aberdeen. Kincardine and West Aberdeenshire covered the county of Kincardine (minus the burgh of Inverbervie, which was included in Montrose Burghs) and part of the county of Aberdeen.

The same boundaries were used in the 1922, 1923, 1924, 1929, 1931, 1935 and 1945 general elections.

1950 to 1955 
For the 1950 general election boundaries were redefined again, by the House of Commons (Redistribution of Seats) Act 1949. A new list of wards defined Aberdeen South – Ferryhill, Holburn, Rosemount, Rubislaw, Ruthrieston and Torry  – but the City of Aberdeen remained a two-constituency city, divided between Aberdeen South and Aberdeen North, with both constituencies entirely within the city.

The county of Aberdeen was then again divided between East Aberdeenshire and West Aberdeenshire, with both of these constituencies entirely within the county.

The same boundaries were used for the 1951 general election.

1955 to 1983 
By the time of the 1955 general election, a boundary review had taken account of a small enlargement of the city area. However, the same list of wards – Ferryhill, Holburn, Rosemount, Rubislaw, Ruthrieston and Torry – continued to define Aberdeen South, and the same boundaries were used for the 1959 general election, the 1964 general election, the 1966 general election, the 1970 general election, the February 1974 general election and the October 1974 general election.

In 1975, throughout Scotland, under the Local Government (Scotland) Act 1973, counties were abolished, and the City of Aberdeen was enlarged to include areas formerly within the county of Aberdeen and the county of Kincardine. Also, the city became a district within the Grampian region. The enlarged city included areas covered by the constituencies of West Aberdeenshire and North Angus and Mearns. North Angus and Mearns had been created in 1950 to cover the county of Kincardine and part of the county of Angus.

The 1979 general election was held before a review of constituency boundaries took account of new local government boundaries.

1983 to 1997 
For the 1983 election, the electoral wards used to create this seat were Rosemount, Rubislaw, St Clements, St Nicholas, Hazlehead, Holburn, Ferryhill, Torry, Nigg.

The 1983 general election, the 1987 general election and the 1992 general election took place during this period. At the 1992 general election the constituency was the only seat which Labour had won at the 1987 election to be gained by the Conservatives.

In 1996, under the Local Government etc (Scotland) Act 1994, local government regions and districts were abolished and the city became one of 32 unitary council areas of Scotland. Also, the name of the city became, officially, Aberdeen City.

1997 to 2005 
As redefined for the 1997 general election Aberdeen South was one of three constituencies covering and entirely within the Aberdeen City area, the other two being Aberdeen North and Aberdeen Central. Aberdeen South shared boundaries with both of the other two constituencies.

The same boundaries were used for the 2001 general election.

Voting patterns 

Aberdeen South was traditionally a strong Liberal Party constituency until it was won by the Unionist Party at the 1918 general election. The constituency subsequently went on to return Unionist MPs to Parliament until the party amalgamated with the Conservatives in 1965. The constituency developed into a Unionist-Labour marginal in 1964 and was gained by Labour's Donald Dewar in 1966, who went on to become the leader of the Scottish Labour Party and later the first-ever First Minister of Scotland in 1999. From the 1970 general election onwards, Aberdeen South returned Conservative MPs to Parliament. The seat was gained by Labour in 1987 and regained by the Conservatives in 1992. At Labour's 1997 landslide election victory Aberdeen South fell to Labour's Anne Begg, who represented the constituency until the 2015 general election when the constituency was gained by Callum McCaig of the Scottish National Party.

Throughout the 2000s, the Liberal Democrats emerged as the main challenger to Labour in Aberdeen South, taking second place in 2005 behind Labour by just 3.2% of the vote. In the Scottish Parliament the equivalent Aberdeen South constituency was represented by the Liberal Democrats from 1999 until 2011, when the constituency of Aberdeen South and North Kincardine was gained by the SNP. Recently the Conservatives have made a set of substantial advances in Aberdeen South, making gains in the constituency at the 2015 UK general election despite seeing a drop in their national vote share across Scotland. At the 2016 Scottish Parliament election the Conservatives finished in second place in the Aberdeen South and North Kincardine constituency, more than doubling their vote share in the constituency and coming behind the SNP by 8.5% of the vote.

Ross Thomson of the Conservatives went on to gain the seat at the 2017 snap general election with a majority of 4,752 votes (10.6%) ahead of the sitting SNP MP Callum McCaig.

In 2019, the seat went back to the SNP when Thomson declined to stand again after controversy. Stephen Flynn became the MP with a majority of 3,990 votes with 44.7% of the vote. This means that in the 10 years between 2010 and 2019, four MPs from three different parties had represented the seat. Notably, since 1964 no candidate has ever managed to secure an absolute majority - 50% of the vote or more.

Members of Parliament

Election results

Elections in the 1880s

Elections in the 1890s

Elections in the 1900s

Elections in the 1910s

Elections in the 1920s

Elections in the 1930s

Elections in the 1940s

Elections in the 1950s

Elections in the 1960s

Elections in the 1970s

Elections in the 1980s

Elections in the 1990s

Elections in the 2000s

Elections in the 2010s

References 
Specific

General

Westminster Parliamentary constituencies in Scotland
Constituencies of the Parliament of the United Kingdom established in 1885
Politics of the county of Aberdeen